The Whistleblowers is a British drama series, first broadcast on ITV from 27 September to 1 November 2007. The series stars Richard Coyle and Indira Varma as personal injury lawyers Ben Graham and Alisha Cole, who set themselves up in private practice after witnessing a covert team of police officers kidnapping a suspect in broad daylight.  Described as ITV's answer to Hustle and Spooks, only one series of the programme was broadcast, before it was axed by the network. A DVD of the series was subsequently released on 12 November 2007.

Critical reception
Gerard O'Donovan of The Telegraph said of the opening episode: "ITV has been looking for a rival to BBC One’s glossy hits Hustle and Spooks for some time now. The Whistleblowers, a drama series about a pair of toothsome young lawyers wielding the twin swords of truth and justice to expose corporate and government corruption, was commissioned with that in mind. And with the likes of scriptwriter Tony Marchant at the helm and the likeable Richard Coyle and Indira Varma in the lead roles, ITV must have felt they were onto a winner. For last night’s opener to get off to a great start only to ebb away into cliché and numbskullery was, therefore, more than usually disappointing. The characters were well set up. Ben (Coyle) and Alisha (Varma) were lawyers working for the same City firm. He was the cut and run merchant, she the cautious high-flyer. Driving home one night they came across a half-naked hooded man being bundled into a Range Rover by big chaps in Army fatigues, so they did what any self-respecting lawyers would do – they backed off. So far so good, but unfortunately their lives then became a morass of unlikely coincidences and unlawyer-like behaviour.

The hooded man conveniently turned up again in the house opposite their flat and the big chaps left the curtains open while indulging in a spot of torture. Not only that, they left the front door open while signing for a delivery, allowing Ben to sneak in and find a very articulate terrorist suspect in the basement. “I’m being held by rogue British security agents. It’s a big conspiracy. Can you call my campaigning lawyer for me,” only mildly paraphrases his actual words. Suffice to say that the bad guys were defeated and our dynamic duo, having run the gamut of MI5 nastiness, emerged grinning like Cheshire cats, announcing to a breathless media scrum that they were founding an agency for fellow lid-lifters in need of white knights. After that start, I wouldn’t trust them to challenge a parking ticket. But there are five more episodes to come. Let’s hope they’re more convincing."

Cast
 Richard Coyle as Ben Graham
 Indira Varma as Alisha Cole
 Daniel Ryan as Kenny Reed
 Paul Freeman as Joseph Cole

Episodes

References

External links
 

2007 British television series debuts
2007 British television series endings
2000s British drama television series
British detective television series
2000s British crime television series
2000s British mystery television series
ITV television dramas
2000s British television miniseries
English-language television shows